Dhakshinkhan Thana is a thana of Dhaka city, Bangladesh.

History 
Dakshinkhan Thana was established in 2006. Nawab Alivardi Khan and his descendants named Khan, the area was named Dakshin Khan. The police station is named after the erstwhile "Dakshinkhan Adarsh Union Parishad".

Geography 
Gazipur Sadar Upazila is situated to the north of Dakshinkhan Thana, Khilkhet Thana to the south, Uttar Khan Thana to the east and Bimanbandar Thana to the west.

Population 
177760 male 99743 female 78017 Muslim 169813 Hindu 6455 Buddhist 921 Christian 296 and others 275

References 

Thanas of Dhaka